ToursByLocals is a Canadian-based, international private tour provider. Headquartered in Vancouver, with offices in Buenos Aires, Kuala Lumpur and Glasgow, the company serves upwards of 400,000 clients a year, connecting them with over 4400 private tour guides in 188 countries and 1,500 locations.

The company is a member of the Local Travel Movement, which aims to connect independent and mindful travellers with local people and local experiences.

History 

Founded in 2008 by Paul Melhus and Dave Vincent, the company initially focused on the basic function of connecting travellers with local guides via an online platform, relying on peer reviews to establish quality control measures. One of the originators of the "peer to peer" travel model the company has since shifted to offering more closely managed, curated tour content and shore excursions for cruise ships.

The company actively recruits independent local guides in new locations globally, and currently accepts roughly 1 in 9 applications after a multi-stage screening and interview process.

In January 2020, ToursByLocals announced $33 million in series A funding with Austin, Texas-based growth capital fund Tritium Partners. Funds from the round will be used for enhancements in user experience, technology, marketing and recruiting more talent.

References

Canadian travel websites
Travel and holiday companies of Canada
Peer-to-peer